Toffee is a confection made by caramelizing sugar or molasses (creating inverted sugar) along with butter, and occasionally flour. While being prepared, toffee is sometimes mixed with nuts or raisins.

Variants and applications 
A popular variant in the United States is English toffee, which is a very buttery toffee often made with almonds. It is available in both chewy and hard versions. Heath bars are a brand of confection made with an English toffee core. Although named English toffee, it bears little resemblance to the wide range of confectionery known as toffee currently available in the United Kingdom. However, one can still find this product in the UK under the name "butter crunch". Conversely, in Italy they are known as "mou candies".

Etymology 
The origins of the word are unknown. Food writer Harold McGee claims it to be "from the Creole for a mixture of sugar and molasses", but which creole language is not specified. The Oxford English Dictionary dates the first publication of the word to 1825 and identifies it as a variation of the word taffy (1817), both of which are first recorded as English dialectical words.

See also 

 Almond Roca
 Bonfire toffee
 Butterscotch
 Caramel
 Caramel candy
 Dulce de leche
 Fudge
 Knäck
 Krówki
 Moffat toffee
 Peanut brittle
 Russian candy
 Sticky toffee pudding
 Tablet (confectionery)
 Taffy (candy)
 Tameletjie
 Toffee hammer
 Toffo

References 

 
Candy